WROV-HD2 (96.3 MHz) is an all-news radio station, aimed at African-American listeners and licensed to Martinsville, Virginia.  It carries the Black Information Network and is owned by iHeartMedia, Inc.  The HD-2 digital subchannel feeds 250-watt FM translator W244AV at 96.7 MHz in Blacksburg, Virginia.

History
On February 8, 2018, WROV-HD2 rebranded as "Alt 96".

On November 18, 2020, WROV-HD2 and W244AV changed their format from alternative rock to African-American-oriented news, branded as "Roanoke's BIN 96.7."  Programming comes from the Black Information Network. The alternative rock format continues on 104.9 WSTV-HD2 and W245BG.

Translator
WROV-HD2 is relayed by an FM translator to widen its broadcast area.

Previous logo

References

External links
Roanoke's BIN 96.7 Online

ROV-HD2
IHeartMedia radio stations
Black Information Network stations
All-news radio stations in the United States